Miss Earth Spain is a national beauty pageant in Spain and has been held since 2019. It is responsible for selecting the country's representatives to the Miss Earth international pageant.
The main winner is being sent to Miss Earth which is an annual international beauty pageant promoting environmental awareness.

History
The Miss Earth franchise was being handled by Miss Spain before 2011. The Runner-up of Miss España or sometimes the 2nd Runner-up or Top 5 represents her country at Miss Earth.

In 2011, the official candidate will be selected by the Miss Tierra Spain pageant.

Starting in 2017, the Miss Earth Spain will be determined through one of the winners of the national pageant Showstars Spain headed by Julio Cesar Battaglia.

Titleholders

Miss Earth Spain
Color key

See also
 Miss Spain
 Miss Earth

References

Spain
Beauty pageants in Spain
Recurring events established in 2001
Spanish awards